Baniyas Refinery Sports Club is a Syrian football club based in the city of Baniyas. The club promoted to the Syrian Premier League for the first time in their history in 2011–12 season.

Honours
 Syrian League First Division: 2010-2011: Top Group (A) and promoted to First Division. 
 Syrian Cup: 1996-1997: Quarter-finals, 2013-2014: Runners-up

Current squad

Former players
  Ahmad Al Douni

References

Football clubs in Syria
Association football clubs established in 1989
1989 establishments in Syria
Baniyas